opened as Shinano Art Museum in , Nagano, Nagano Prefecture, Japan in 1966, becoming a prefectural museum three years later. It is dedicated to the artists of, and works relating to, Shinshū, including paintings by Hishida Shunsō, Nakamura Fusetsu, and Fujishima Takeji. On 26 April 1990, the  opened as an annex; currently, there are more than 970 works by the artist. After fifty years, in 2017, the complex closed for renewal, the Higashiyama Kaii Gallery reopening in 2019, the Art Museum scheduled to reopen in April 2021.

See also
 Zenkō-ji
 Nagano Prefectural Museum of History
 Shinano Province

References

External links

 Nagano Prefectural Shinano Art Museum

Nagano (city)
Museums in Nagano Prefecture
Art museums and galleries in Japan
Museums established in 1966
1966 establishments in Japan